Maathaad Maathaadu Mallige, is a 2007 Kannada-language film directed by  Nagathihalli Chandrashekhar starring Vishnuvardhan. The film depicts the challenges faced by the people living in rural areas of India.

Plot

The film starts with a happy small family of Hoovaiah (Dr.Vishnuvardhan) and Kanaka (Suhasini) having a small field growing flowers of Mallige, Sampige and other flowers which spread fragrance. The couple have three daughters in a small village of Jenu Koppa. Hoovaiah stands true to his devotion to Gandhi philosophy of Satyagraha come whatever may facing with nonchalance  and non-violence. Globalization companies cause problems for the village as there are rich mine deposits nearby. Hoovaiah, zamindar of Jenu Koppa village, is a flower seller. Villagers revere him. When the government gives an MNC the licence to acquire land for mining in Jenukoppa, he strongly opposes it. But Kurupayya (Rangayana Raghu) joins hands with politicians and officials and tries to brainwash people to sell their land for a huge amount. Police atrocities and lathi charges on villagers force Hoovaiah to fight a lone battle against land acquisition. Fed up by the turn of events, all villagers decide to leave the village. But Hoovaiah launches a hunger strike to save the village and finally wins the battle.

Cast
 Dr.Vishnuvardhan as Hoovaiah
 Suhasini as Kanaka
 Nivedhitha
 Arun Sagar
 Rangayana Raghu as Kurupayya
 Tara
 Nagathihalli Chandrashekhar
 C. R. Simha
 Mandya Ramesh
 Sihi Kahi Chandru
 Komal
 Santhosh Aryan
 Sudeep as Extremist Leader (Guest appearance)

Release
Maathaad Maathaadu Mallige was released on 24 August 2007. And also released in San Jose, California, United States on 24 August 2007.

Critical reception
The film got positive reviews upon its release. Reddiff.com gave 4/5 stars saying "Maathaad Maathaadu Mallige is not a film with slow paced narration; it is a commercial film with a good message. A must-see film.". Times of India gave 4/5 stars and wrote "VISHNUVARDHAN'S brilliance and an excellent script by Nagathihalli Chandrasekhar make Mathad Mathadu Mallige a film worth watching". Indiaglitz.com gave score 8/10 stating "This is not just a film. Film that is food for thought too! It is an awakening cinema and clarion call for the villagers and farmers."

Awards

Karnataka State Film Awards :-

 Best Film Third
 Best Lyricist - Gollahalli Shivaprasad for "Jhana Jhana Kaanchanadalli" Song 

Southern India Cinematographer's Association Awards (SICA Awards) :-

 Best Writer (story) - Nagathihalli Chandrashekhar
 Best Cinematographer - Krishnakumar 

Udaya Film Awards :-
 Best Cinematography - Krishnakumar 

Filmfare Awards South :-
 Best Actor - Vishnuvardhan - Nominated
 Best Director - Nagathihalli Chandrashekhar - Nominated
 Best Film - Nominated

Soundtrack

The official soundtrack contains 9 songs composed by Mano Murthy with lyrics penned by Nagathihalli Chandrashekhar and Gollahalli Shivprasad.

External links

References

2000s Kannada-language films
2007 films
Films shot in Ooty
Films scored by Mano Murthy
Films directed by Nagathihalli Chandrashekhar